The Petermann Ranges are a number of associated mountain ranges including the Östliche Petermann, Mittlere Petermann, Westliche Petermann, Südliche Petermann, and Pieck Ranges, located just east of the Humboldt Mountains in the central Wohlthat Mountains of Queen Maud Land.

These mountain ranges were discovered and plotted from air photos by the Third German Antarctic Expedition (1938–1939), led by Capt. Alfred Ritscher, who named it for August Petermann.

Geographical features

References

Mountain ranges of Queen Maud Land
Princess Astrid Coast

simple:Petermann Ranges